Žanis Peiners (born 1 August 1990) is a Latvian professional basketball player. He is 2.05 m (6 ft  in) tall shooting guard-small forward.

Professional career
In 2009, he started pro career with VEF Rīga. After that season, he went to Latvijas Universitāte, where he played the next three seasons. Peiners helped his team, which consisted of semi-professional student-athletes, to reach the LBL playoffs twice. He was scoring the champion of the LBL in 2013, averaging 21.1 points per game.

In 2013, Žanis graduated from LU, and attracted the attention of multiple clubs from abroad. He had strong interest from KK Union Olimpija, but ultimately decided to sign with MBC Mykolaiv. He finished the season in the Ukrainian SuperLeague, as the league's second best scorer (16.1 points per game).

On 17 September 2014 he joined the defending Latvian League champions, Ventspils. On 20 July 2016 Peiners signed with the Greek club PAOK Thessaloniki.

In June 2018, Peiners signed with Darüşşafaka of the Basketbol Süper Ligi (BSL) and EuroLeague.

In July 2019, Peiners signed with Partizan of the ABA League and EuroCup.

Latvian national team
Peiners has also been a member of the senior men's Latvian national basketball team. With Latvia's senior national team, he played at the EuroBasket 2015 and EuroBasket 2017.

Career statistics

EuroLeague

|-
| style="text-align:left;"| 2018–19
| style="text-align:left;"| Darüşşafaka
| 28 || 14 || 17.3 || .539 || .300 || .864 || 1.9 || 1.5 || .4 || .2 || 6.7 || 7.9
|- class="sortbottom"
| style="text-align:left;"| Career
| style="text-align:left;"|
| 28 || 14 || 17.3 || .539 || .300 || .864 || 1.9 || 1.5 || .4 || .2 || 6.7 || 7.9

References

External links
FIBA Europe Profile
FIBA Game Center Profile
FIBA Archive Profile
Eurobasket.com Profile
Greek Basket League Profile 
Greek Basket League Profile 
Latvian League Profile 

1990 births
Living people
ABA League players
BC Lietkabelis players
BK VEF Rīga players
BK Ventspils players
Darüşşafaka Basketbol players
Latvian expatriate basketball people in Greece
KK Partizan players
Latvian expatriate basketball people in Ukraine
Latvian expatriate basketball people in Serbia
Latvian men's basketball players
MBC Mykolaiv players
P.A.O.K. BC players
People from Rēzekne
Point guards
Shooting guards
Small forwards